Pediasia abnaki is a moth in the family Crambidae. It was described by Alexander Barrett Klots in 1942. It is found in North America, where it has been recorded from Maine, Michigan, Nova Scotia, Ohio, Alberta, Quebec, Ontario and New Brunswick. The habitat consists of grasslands. Adults have been recorded on wing from June to August.

The larvae probably feed on the roots of grasses.

References

Crambini
Moths described in 1942
Moths of North America